The Cypriot Cup is the top knockout tournament of the Cyprus Turkish Football Federation, Turkish Republic of Northern Cyprus. It was created in 1956 as the Kıbrıs Kupası, and was known as the "Federation Cup" (Turkish: Federasyon Kupası) for some time, but the name was changed back to "Kıbrıs Kupası" in 2014.

The winner of the Cypriot Cup plays with the winner of the Süper Lig in the KTFF Super Cup.

Winners

Cypriot Cup (Kıbrıs Kupası) 
1956 : Çetinkaya Türk 3-2 Dogan Türk Birligi
1957 : Çetinkaya Türk 4-3 Dogan Türk Birligi
1958 : Çetinkaya Türk 2-1 Yenicami Ağdelen
1959 : Çetinkaya Türk 6-0 Gençlik Gücü
1960 : Çetinkaya Türk 2-0 Gençlik Gücü
1961 : Magusa Türk Gücü 2-1 Yenicami Ağdelen
1962 : Yenicami Ağdelen 5-2 Baf Ülkü Yurdu
1963 : Çetinkaya Türk 3-0 Küçük Kaymakli
1969 : Çetinkaya Türk 3-1 Yenicami Ağdelen
1970 : Çetinkaya Türk 2-0 Yenicami Ağdelen
1971 : Gönyeli 2-0 Gençlik Gücü
1972 : Lefke 4-0 Baf Ülkü Yurdu
1973 : Yenicami Ağdelen 4-1 Gönyeli
1974 : Yenicami Ağdelen 1-0 Gönyeli
1976 : Çetinkaya Türk 3-0 Baf Ülkü Yurdu
1977 : Magusa Türk Gücü 3-0 Gönyeli
1978 : Doğan Türk Birliği 3-0 Yenicami Ağdelen
1979 : Magusa Türk Gücü 2-0 Gönyeli
1980 : Küçük Kaymakli 1-0 Magusa Türk Gücü
1981 : Gençlik Gücü 4-1, 1-0 Yenicami Ağdelen
1982 : Türk Ocagi  1-0, 1-2 Küçük Kaymakli
1983 : Magusa Türk Gücü 3-0, 1-2 Gönyeli
1984 : Türk Ocagi 0-0, 2-0 Gönyeli
1985 : Gönyeli 1-2, 2-0 Dogan Türk Birligi
1986 : Küçük Kaymakli 1-1, 1-0 Magusa Türk Gücü
1987 : Magusa Türk Gücü 3-3, 2-0 Yalova
1988 : Küçük Kaymakli 2-0, 1-2 Dogan Türk Birligi

Federation Cup (Federasyon Kupası) 
1989 : Yenicami Ağdelen 0-0, 3-2 Dogan Türk Birligi
1990 : Türk Ocagi 1-0 Dogan Türk Birligi
1991 : Çetinkaya Türk 2-0 Küçük Kaymakli
1992 : Çetinkaya Türk 4-1 Binatli
1993 : Çetinkaya Türk 3-2 Gençlik Gücü
1994 : Yalova 1-0 Gaziveren
1995 : Gönyeli 6-0 Girne Halk Evi
1996 : Çetinkaya Türk 4-0 Akincilar
1997 : Küçük Kaymakli 3-0 Gönyeli
1998 : Gönyeli 3-1 Çetinkaya Türk
1999 : Çetinkaya Türk 4-2 Gönyeli
2000 : Gönyeli 5-2 Esentepe
2001 : Çetinkaya Türk 4-1 Küçük Kaymakli
2002 : Küçük Kaymakli 3-2 Gönyeli
2003 : Yenicami Ağdelen 2-1 Magusa Türk Gücü
2004 : Küçük Kaymakli 2-1 Yenicami Ağdelen
2005 : Binatli 2-1 Gönyeli
2006 : Çetinkaya Türk 4-0 Ozanköy
2007 : Türk Ocagi 4-0 Tatlisu
2008 : Gönyeli 5-1 Esentepe
2009 : Gönyeli 3-0 Küçük Kaymakli
2010 : Gönyeli 3-1 Bostancı Bağcıl S.K.
2011 : Çetinkaya Türk 3-0 Lefke S.K.
2012 : Doğan Türk Birliği 2:2 (p.4:2) Küçük Kaymakli
2013 : Yenicami Ağdelen 2:0 Magusa Türk Gücü

Cypriot Cup (Kıbrıs Kupası) 
2014 : Lefke 3-1 Yenicami Ağdelen
2015 : Yenicami Ağdelen 4:2 Mormenekşe
2016 : Küçük Kaymakli 2:2 (p.4:3) Yenicami Ağdelen
2017 : Türk Ocagi 1-0 Yalova
2018 : Cihangir               3-1 Mağusa Türk Gücü 
2019 : Mağusa Türk Gücü        2-1 Yenicami  
2020 : Yenicami                3-1 Mağusa Türk Gücü
2022 : Mağusa Türk Gücü 2:0 Doğan Türk Birliği

Performance by club 
17  Çetinkaya Türk Spor Kulübü
8  Gönyeli Türk Spor Kulübü
8  Yenicami Agdelen Spor Kulübü
8  Magusa Türk Gücü
7  Küçük Kaymakli Türk Spor Kulübü
4  Türk Ocagi Limasol
2  Doğan Türk Birliği
2  Lefke
1  Gençlik Gücü Spor Kulübü
1  Binatli Y Spor Kulübü
1  Cihangir
1  Yalova Türk Spor Kulübü

References

External links
List of cup finals – RSSSF

Football competitions in Northern Cyprus
Turkish Republic of Northern Cyprus
Recurring sporting events established in 1958
1956 establishments in Cyprus